Pyrgomantis fasciata is a species of praying mantis found in Angola, Tanzania, Mozambique, Transvaal and the Congo River region.

See also
List of mantis genera and species

References

Pyrgomantis
Mantodea of Africa
Insects described in 1917